The Morse–Barber House is a historic house in Sherborn, Massachusetts.  Architectural evidence suggests that this -story frame house has at its core a First Period structure that may date to the early 1670s, making it the oldest building in Sherborn.  The property also has a barn dating to the late 18th or early 19th century.  The property was listed on the National Register of Historic Places in 1986.

Description and history
The Morse–Barber House is located on the southeast side of Forest Street in southeaster Sherborn, just west of the Rocky Narrows Reservation and the railroad tracks.  The house and accompanying barn are set close to the street, the house sheltered from the road by a fringe of trees.  The main house is a -story wood-frame structure, five symmetrically placed bays in width, with a side-gable roof and a large central chimney.  The western portion of the structure, a three-bay two-story section that is one room deep, may have been built around 1670 by Joseph Morse, the son of one of Sherborn's first land grant recipients.  Morse's home is known to have been the site of the community's first religious services, until a proper meeting house was built in the 1680s.  The house, which now has Federal and Greek Revival exterior styling, was in the Barber family from the mid-18th century to the late 19th century.

The barn is set northeast of the house and is oriented parallel to the road. Above this door is an extended multi-light rectangular transom window, with a sash window to the left of the door and another above in the gable. Attached to the building to the right of the door is a single-story equipment shed with two vehicle doors. The main barn matches in rough dimension a barn described in a 1798 inventory of the property; the attached shed is present in photographs from later in the 19th century.

See also
National Register of Historic Places listings in Sherborn, Massachusetts

References

Houses on the National Register of Historic Places in Middlesex County, Massachusetts
Houses in Sherborn, Massachusetts
Greek Revival architecture in Massachusetts